The Patalpani railway station (station code: PTP) is one of the local railway stations of Indore City in the state of Madhya Pradesh. The station consists of two platforms. The platforms are not well sheltered. It lacks many facilities including water and sanitation.

Patalpani has been connected to Indore and Khandwa by metre-gauge railway lines. In 2008, the Union Cabinet approved the gauge conversion for the Akola-Ratlam line of 472.64 km. The cost of the gauge conversion would be about Rs.1421.25 crore.

It is the nearest railway station used for access to Patalpani waterfall, which is a well-known tourist spot near Indore that is prone to flash floods.

Connectivity

The station is well-connected to Indore Jn. via Dr. Ambedkar Nagar, Mhow.

Electrification
At present, the station is on non-electrified rail route.

Developments
Upon completion, It would directly connect Indore to Mumbai.

See also
 Akola–Ratlam (metre-gauge trains)

References

Railway stations in Indore district
Ratlam railway division